Labour and Society International (LSI) was a non-governmental organization launched in the United Kingdom in the 1990s.  Its founders were Arthur Lipow and David Clement.  It ceased functioning in 2002–2003, and its last director was Stirling Smith.  LSI co-sponsored a book series with Pluto Press, held conferences and published papers, and did work on projects with global union federations in developing countries.  It also sponsored the LabourStart website for its first four years.

References 

Global workforce and labor organizations
Socialist organisations in the United Kingdom
Organizations established in the 1990s
Organizations disestablished in the 2000s
1990s establishments in the United Kingdom
2000s disestablishments in the United Kingdom